The little skate (Leucoraja erinacea) is a species of skate in the family Rajidae, found from Nova Scotia to North Carolina on sand or gravel habitats. They are one of the dominant members of the demersal fish community in the northwestern Atlantic. This species is of minimal commercial importance and is mostly used as bait for lobster traps, though its wings are also marketed for food. It is also important as a model organism for biological and medical research.

Distribution and habitat
This skate is native to the western Atlantic Ocean, from Nova Scotia, Canada, to Cape Hatteras, North Carolina, USA. They are most abundant in the northern Mid-Atlantic Bight and the Georges Bank. They do not undertake long migrations, but at the inshore parts of the species' range individuals move into shallower water during the summer and deeper water during the fall and winter. At the southern extent of the range, many also move north and south with changing temperatures.

Description

The little skate has a rounded pectoral fin disk 1.2 times as wide and as long, and a blunt snout with a central tip. The jaws contain 38–66 series of round teeth on plates, adapted for grinding food. The pelvic fins are divided into two parts, with the forward lobe modified into a leg-like structure. The tail is longer than the disk in juveniles and shorter in adults. Two small, closely spaced dorsal fins are located near the tip of the tail. Adults have small dermal denticles and usually no midline thorns, though there are strong spines on the dorsal surfaces of the head, shoulders, and tail. Males tend to have fewer spines than females.

The coloration of the little skate ranges from grayish to uniform or variable shades of brown above, becoming lighter towards the edges of the disk, and white or gray below. Most individuals have small, round, dark spots on the back. The tail has irregular dusky blotches or a dark gray ventral surface. The little skate may be confused with unspotted individuals of the winter skate (Leucoraja ocellata), which has a similar shape. Little skates grow to a larger maximum size in the northern part of their range.

Biology and ecology
Little skates are more active at night and spend much of the day buried in sediment, usually near specific landscape features such as depressions excavated by other animals. They employ a curious mode of locomotion, dubbed "punting" by the first scientists to document it, to move over the sea floor. The forward lobes of the pelvic fins are modified into leg-like structures called "crura" (singular "crus"), containing three flexible joints and modified skeletal and muscular elements. The little skate pushes off the substrate with both crura and then glides a short distance on its wings while repositioning the crura for the next push. The crura are also used as pivots when the skate needs to turn. Research proposes that the locomotion is akin to that found in land vertebrates and thus puts the evolution of the underlying genes 20 million years earlier. It has been speculated that using the pelvic fins in this manner assists in hunting, by reducing water turbulence that might alert the prey or distort the ray's electroreception.

The tail of the little skate contains an electric organ that intermittently generates a weak electric field (the electric organ discharge or EOD). The EOD lasts 70 ms and has a head-negative monophasic waveform. This electric organ is thought to function in communication, and may help potential mates locate one another.

Young and adult little skates are preyed upon by sharks, other skates, teleost fishes (including cod, goosefish, sea ravens, longhorn sculpins, bluefish, and summer flounder), gray seals, androck crabs (Cancer irroratus). Their egg-cases are preyed on by the sea urchin Strongylocentrotus droebachiensis and the whelk Buccinum undatum. Known parasites of the little skate include the protozoans Caliperia brevipes, Haemogregarina delagei, and Trypanosoma rajae, the myxosporeans Chloromyxum leydigi and Leptotheca agilis, the nematode Pseudanisakis tricupola, and the copepods Eudactylina corrugata and Lernaeopodina longimana.

Feeding
The diet of the little skate consists mostly of decapod crustaceans and amphipods. Polychaete worms are also an important prey item, while other invertebrates (including isopods, bivalves, squid, sea squirts, and copepods) and small benthic fishes (including sand lances, herring, cunners, and cod) are rarely taken. The importance of crustaceans in the skate's diet increases with size. This species shares its benthic habitat with the similar winter skate; the little skate focuses more on epifauna (organisms living atop the substrate) while the winter skate eats more infauna (burrowing organisms). The little skate has an extremely high number of electrosensory ampullae of Lorenzini around its mouth, giving it a high degree of spatial precision when hunting for prey buried in the substrate.

Reproduction

Little skates are oviparous. Mating occurs frequently throughout the year and pregnant females can be found year-round. However, eggs are most common from October to December and from April to May, and least common from August to September and February to March. An average little skate spawns twice a year, in spring and fall, and produces a total of 10–35 eggs annually. The egg cases are amber-colored when first laid but become greenish-brown and leathery. There are hollow horns at each corner with sticky tendrils to secure the egg case to the substrate; the anterior horns are half as long as the case and curved inward, while the posterior horns are as long as the case and nearly straight.

Eggs raised in captivity hatch in 5–6 months, while those in the wild may take up to 12 months to hatch, depending on temperature. While inside the case, the embryos have a whip-like extension on the tail believed to be used for circulating water. After hatching, the empty egg capsules often wash ashore and are known as "mermaid's purses". At adolescence, males become larger than the females, and this difference persists through adulthood. Very few little skates over 5 years old have been found, suggesting a high mortality rate at that age.

An unusual little skate specimen found off Fishers Island, New York contained a developed testis, vas deferens, and functional clasper on its left side and an adolescent ovary, shell gland, oviduct, and abortive clasper on its right. This example of hermaphroditism (a bilateral gynandromorph) is one of very few known for elasmobranch fishes.

Human interactions
Euell Gibbons promoted the consumption by humans of the little skate in his cookbook Stalking the Blue-eyed Scallop (1964), noting that its wings, properly cut, could be treated like scallops. Round cuts from the little skate's wings are marketed as "scallops", though due to their small size their commercial importance is limited. Little skates are also often used to bait traps, especially for lobsters and eels. Skates are typically caught as bycatch in otter trawls; the little skate is not currently considered to be overfished. Along with the spiny dogfish (Squalus acanthias), the little skate is often used as a model organism in biomedical research. A BAC genomic library for the little skate was completed in January 2005.

References

External links

Little Skate at the Florida Museum of Natural History Ichthyology Department
Videos of little skates "punting" at David M. Koester's webpage
 F. Giardina, L. Mahadevan: Models of benthic bipedalism. Journal of the Royal Society Interface, Volume 18, Issue 174, 13 January 2021. doi:10.6084/m9.figshare.c.5250907. See also
 Carly Cassella: Ancient Vertebrates May Have Had Tools For Walking Long Before They Left The Ocean. On: sciencealert, 19 March 2021. Gif and Video included. 

little skate
Natural history of Nova Scotia
Fauna of the Northeastern United States
Fish of the Eastern United States
little skate